Eduardo Castex is a small city, capital of Conhelo, in La Pampa Province, Argentina.

The city is a centre of agricultural activity and the main producer of wheat in La Pampa. Its name comes from the founder Ingeniero (Engineer) Eduardo Castex, in the first years of the 20th century. From the 1920s to the 1940s, it was populated with immigrants coming from Italy, and parts of Spain such as many of Salamanca or Zamora. The population for Eduardo Castex is 9,347.

See also

 List of largest cuckoo clocks

Populated places in La Pampa Province
Populated places established in 1908
1908 establishments in Argentina
La Pampa Province
Argentina
Cities in Argentina